The 2010 Rotherham Metropolitan Borough Council election took place on 6 May 2010 to elect members of Rotherham Council in South Yorkshire, England as part of the 2010 United Kingdom local elections. One third of the council was up for election.

After the election, the composition of the council was:
Labour 50
Conservative 10
BNP 1
Others 2

Election result

Ward Results

Anston and Woodsetts

Boston Castle

Brinsworth and Catcliffe

Dinnington

Hellaby

Holderness

Hoober

Keppel

Maltby

Rawmarsh

Rother Vale

Rotherham East

Rotherham West

Silverwood

Sitwell

Swinton

Valley

Wales

Wath

Wickersley

Wingfield

References

2010 English local elections
May 2010 events in the United Kingdom
2010
2010s in South Yorkshire